Mohammad Anzar Nayeemi is an Indian politician and a member of the Bihar legislative Assembly representing the Bahadurganj (Vidhan Sabha constituency) for the All India Majlis-e-Ittehadul Muslimeen (AIMIM).

Early Background 
Mohammad Anzar Nayeemi was born to Nayeemuddin Ahmad on 3 February 1972. He comes from an influential family of Bahadurganj. His father Nayeemuddin Ahmad was a social activist & a key founder member of Bahadurganj College, Bahadurganj and Darul Uloom Bahadurganj which later brought revolution in the field of education.

He did his schooling from Russell High School Bahadurganj and holds a degree in Commerce (B.Com.) from B.N. Mandal University, Madhepura.

He had contested election representing RJD in 2010 Bihar Assembly election, but did not finish on top, and recontested in 2020 representing AIMIM and won with huge margin.

References 

1972 births
Living people
Indian politicians